The Sangam literature (Tamil: சங்க இலக்கியம், caṅka ilakkiyam;) historically known as 'the poetry of the noble ones' (Tamil: சான்றோர் செய்யுள், Cāṉṟōr ceyyuḷ) connotes the ancient Tamil literature and is the earliest known literature of South India. The Tamil tradition and legends link it to three literary gatherings around Madurai and Kapāṭapuram (Pandyan capitals): the first over 4,440 years, the second over 3,700 years, and the third over 1,850 years before the start of the common era. Scholars consider this Tamil tradition-based chronology as ahistorical and mythical. Most scholars suggest the historical Sangam literature era spanned from c. 300 BCE to 300 CE, while others variously place this early classical Tamil literature period a bit later and more narrowly but all before 300 CE. According to Kamil Zvelebil – a Tamil literature and history scholar, the most acceptable range for the Sangam literature is 100 BCE to 250 CE, based on the linguistic, prosodic and quasi-historic allusions within the texts and the colophons.

Recent excavations in Keezhadi has confirmed with carbon dating that the cultural deposits found may be 300 to 500-years older than current acceptable range of Sangam literature.  The cultural deposits unearthed during the excavation was dated to a period as early as 800 BCE to 600 BCE.  Amarnath Ramakrishnan, an Indian archaeologist noted for his research into the Keezhadi excavation site (a Sangam era settlement in Tamil Nadu), has submitted his 1000-page report to the Archaeological Survey of India recently explaining his findings.  The full report has not been released to the public by the Archaeological Survey of India.  

The Sangam literature had fallen into oblivion for much of the second millennium of the common era, but were preserved by and rediscovered in the monasteries of Hinduism, particularly those related to Shaivism near Kumbakonam, by colonial-era scholars in the late nineteenth century. The rediscovered Sangam classical collection is largely a bardic corpus. It comprises an Urtext of oldest surviving Tamil grammar (Tolkappiyam), the Ettuttokai anthology (the "Eight Collections"), the Pattuppattu anthology (the "Ten Songs"). The Tamil literature that followed the Sangam period – that is, after c. 250 CE but before c. 600 CE – is generally called the "post-Sangam" literature.

This collection contains 2381 poems in Tamil composed by 473 poets, some 102 anonymous. Of these, 16 poets account for about 50% of the known Sangam literature, with Kapilar – the most prolific poet – alone contributing just little less than 10% of the entire corpus. These poems vary between 3 and 782 lines long. The bardic poetry of the Sangam era is largely about love (akam) and war (puram), with the exception of the shorter poems such as in paripaatal which is more religious and praise Vishnu, Shiva, Durga and Murugan.

On their significance, Zvelebil quotes A. K. Ramanujan, "In their antiquity and in their contemporaneity, there is not much else in any Indian literature equal to these quiet and dramatic Tamil poems. In their values and stances, they represent a mature classical poetry: passion is balanced by courtesy, transparency by ironies and nuances of design, impersonality by vivid detail, austerity of line by richness of implication. These poems are not just the earliest evidence of the Tamil genius. The Tamils, in all their 2,000 years of literary effort, wrote nothing better." The Sangam literature also includes Buddhism and Jainism epics.

Nomenclature and tradition 

Sangam literally means "gathering, meeting, fraternity, academy". According to David Shulman, a scholar of Tamil language and literature, the Tamil tradition believes that the Sangam literature arose in distant antiquity over three periods, each stretching over many millennia. The first has roots in the Hindu deity Shiva, his son Murugan, Kubera as well as 545 sages including the famed Rigvedic poet Agastya. The first academy, states the legend, extended over four millennia and was located far to the south of modern city of Madurai, a location later "swallowed up by the sea", states Shulman. The second academy, also chaired by a very long-lived Agastya, was near the eastern seaside Kapāṭapuram and lasted three millennia. This was swallowed by floods. From the second Sangam, states the legend, the Akattiyam and the Tolkāppiyam survived and guided the third Sangam scholars.

A prose commentary by Nakkiranar – likely about the eighth century CE – describes this legend. The earliest known mention of the Sangam legend, however, appears in Tirupputtur Tantakam by Appar in about the seventh century CE, while an extended version appears in the twelfth-century Tiruvilaiyatal puranam by Perumparrap Nampi. The legend states that the third Sangam of 449 poet scholars worked over 1,850 years in northern Madurai (Pandyan kingdom). He lists six anthologies of Tamil poems (later a part of Ettuttokai):
Netuntokai nanuru (400 long poems)
Kuruntokai anuru (400 short poems)
Narrinai (400 Tinai landscape poems)
Purananuru (400 Outer poems)
Ainkurunuru (500 very short poems)
Patirruppattu (Ten Tens)

These claims of the Sangams and the description of sunken land masses Kumari Kandam have been dismissed as frivolous by historiographers. Noted historians like Kamil Zvelebil have stressed that the use of 'Sangam literature' to describe this corpus of literature is a misnomer and Classical literature should be used instead. According to Shulman, "there is not the slightest shred of evidence that any such [Sangam] literary academies ever existed", though there are many Pandya inscriptions that mention an academy of scholars. Of particular note, states Shulman, is the tenth-century CE Sinnamanur inscription that mentions a Pandyan king who sponsored the "translation of the Mahabharata into Tamil" and established a "Madhurapuri (Madurai) Sangam".

According to Zvelebil, within the myth there is a kernel of reality, and all literary evidence leads one to conclude that "such an academy did exist in Madurai (Maturai) at the beginning of the Christian era". The homogeneity of the prosody, language and themes in these poems confirms that the Sangam literature was a community effort, a "group poetry". The Sangam literature is also referred sometimes with terms such as caṅka ilakkiyam or "Sangam age poetry".

Authors
The Sangam literature was composed by 473 poets, some 102 anonymous. According to Nilakanta Sastri, the poets came from diverse backgrounds: some were from a royal family, some merchants, some farmers. At least 27 of the poets were women. These poets emerged, states Nilakanta Sastri, in a milieu where the Tamil society had already interacted and inseparably amalgamated with north Indians (Indo-Aryan) and both sides had shared mythology, values and literary conventions.

Compilations 

The available literature from this period was categorised and compiled in the tenth century CE into two categories based roughly on chronology. The categories are the patiṉeṇmēlkaṇakku ("the eighteen greater text series") comprising  Ettuthogai (or Ettuttokai, "Eight Anthologies") and the Pattuppāṭṭu ("Ten Idylls"). According to Takanobu Takahashi, this compilation is as follows:

Classification 

Sangam literature is broadly classified into akam (inner), and puram (outer). The akam poetry is about emotions and feelings in the context of romantic love, sexual union and eroticism. The puram poetry is about exploits and heroic deeds in the context of war and public life. Approximately three-fourths of the Sangam poetry is akam themed, and about one fourth is puram.

Sangam literature, both akam and puram, can be subclassified into seven minor genre called tiṇai (திணை). This minor genre is based on the location or landscape in which the poetry is set. These are: kuṟiñci (குறிஞ்சி), mountainous regions; mullai (முல்லை), pastoral forests; marutam (மருதம்), riverine agricultural land; neytal (நெய்தல்) coastal regions; pālai (பாலை) arid. In addition to the landscape based tiṇais, for akam poetry, ain-tinai (well matched, mutual love), kaikkilai (ill matched, one sided), and perunthinai (unsuited, big genre) categories are used. The Ainkurunuru – 500 short poems anthology – is an example of mutual love poetry.

Similar tiṇais pertain to puram poems as well, categories are sometimes based on activity: vetchi (cattle raid), vanchi (invasion, preparation for war), kanchi (tragedy), ulinai (siege), tumpai (battle), vakai (victory), paataan (elegy and praise), karanthai ,  and pothuviyal. The akam poetry uses metaphors and imagery to set the mood, never uses names of person or places, often leaves the context as well that the community will fill in and understand given their oral tradition. The puram poetry is more direct, uses names and places, states Takanobu Takahashi.

Style and prosody
The early Sangam poetry diligently follows two meters, while the later Sangam poetry is a bit more diverse. The two meters found in the early poetry are akaval and vanci. The fundamental metrical unit in these is the acai (metreme), itself of two types – ner and nirai. The ner is the stressed/long syllable in European prosody tradition, while the nirai is the unstressed/short syllable combination (pyrrhic (dibrach) and iambic) metrical feet, with similar equivalents in the Sanskrit prosody tradition. The acai in the Sangam poems are combined to form a cir (foot), while the cir are connected to form a talai, while the line is referred to as the ati. The sutras of the Tolkappiyam – particularly after sutra 315 – state the prosody rules, enumerating the 34 component parts of ancient Tamil poetry.

The prosody of an example early Sangam poem is illustrated by Kuruntokai:

The prosodic pattern in this poem follows the 4-4-3-4 feet per line, according to akaval, also called aciriyam, Sangam meter rule:

A literal translation of Kuruntokai 119:

English interpretation and translation of Kuruntokai 119:

This metrical pattern, states Zvelebil, gives the Sangam poetry a "wonderful conciseness, terseness, pithiness", then an inner tension that is resolved at the end of the stanza. The metrical patterns within the akaval meter in early Sangam poetry has minor variations. The later Sangam era poems follow the same general meter rules, but sometimes feature 5 lines (4-4-4-3-4). The later Sangam age texts employ other meters as well, such as the Kali meter in Kalittokai and the mixed Paripatal meter in Paripatal.

Preservation and rediscovery 

The works of Sangam literature were lost and forgotten for most of the 2nd millennium. They were rediscovered by colonial-era scholars such as Arumuka Navalar (1822-1879), C.W. Damodaram Pillai (1832-1901) and U. V. Swaminatha Aiyar (1855-1942). 

Arumuka Navalar from Jaffna first inaugurated the modern editions of Tamil classics, publishing a fine edition of Tirukkuṟaḷ by 1860. Navalar – who translated the Bible into Tamil while working as an assistant to a Methodist Christian missionary, chose to defend and popularize Shaiva Hinduism against missionary polemics, in part by bringing ancient Tamil and Shaiva literature to wider attention. He brought the first Sangam text into print in 1851 (Tirumurukāṟṟuppaṭai, one of the Ten Idylls). In 1868, Navalar published an early commentary on Tolkappiyam.

C.W. Damodaram Pillai, also from Jaffna, was the earliest scholar to systematically hunt for long-lost manuscripts and publish them using modern tools of textual criticism.  These included:

 Viracoliyam (1881)
 Iraiyanar Akapporul (1883)
 Tolkappiyam-Porulatikaram (1885)
 Kalittokai (1887) - the first of the Eight Anthologies (Eṭṭuttokai).

Aiyar – a Tamil scholar and a Shaiva pundit, in particular, is credited with his discovery of major collections of the Sangam literature in 1883. During his personal visit to the Thiruvavaduthurai Adhinam – a Shaiva matha about twenty kilometers northeast of Kumbhakonam, he reached out to the monastery head Subrahmanya Desikar for access to its large library of preserved manuscripts. Desikar granted Aiyar permission to study and publish any manuscripts he wanted. There, Aiyar discovered a major source of preserved palm-leaf manuscripts of Sangam literature. Aiyar published his first print of the Ten Idylls in 1889. 

Together, these scholars printed and published  Kalittokai (1887), Tholkappiyam, Nachinarkiniyar Urai (1895), Tholkappiyam Senavariyar urai (1868), Manimekalai (1898), Silappatikaram (1889), Pattuppāṭṭu (1889), Patiṟṟuppattu (1889). Puṟanāṉūṟu (1894), Aiṅkurunūṟu (1903), Kuṟuntokai (1915), Naṟṟiṇai (1915), Paripāṭal (1918) and Akanāṉūṟu (1923) all with scholarly commentaries. They published more than 100 works in all, including minor poems.

Significance
The Sangam literature is the historic evidence of indigenous literary developments in South India in parallel to Sanskrit, and the classical status of the Tamil language. While there is no evidence for the first and second mythical Sangams, the surviving literature attests to a group of scholars centered around the ancient Madurai (Maturai) that shaped the "literary, academic, cultural and linguistic life of ancient Tamil Nadu", states Zvelebil.

The Sangam literature offers a window into some aspects of the ancient Tamil culture, secular and religious beliefs, and the people. For example, in the Sangam era Ainkurunuru poem 202 is one of the earliest mentions of "pigtail of Brahmin boys". These poems also allude to historical incidents, ancient Tamil kings, the effect of war on loved ones and households. The Pattinappalai poem in the Ten Idylls group, for example, paints a description of the Chola capital, the king Karikal, the life in a harbor city with ships and merchandise for seafaring trade, the dance troupes, the bards and artists, the worship of the Hindu god Murugan and the monasteries of Buddhism and Jainism. This Sangam era poem remained in the active memory and was significant to the Tamil people centuries later, as evidenced by its mention nearly 1,000 years later in the 11th- and 12th-century inscriptions and literary work.

The Sangam literature embeds evidence of loan words from Sanskrit, suggesting on-going linguistic and literary collaboration between ancient Tamil Nadu and other parts of the Indian subcontinent. One of the early loan words, for example, is acarya– from Sanskrit for a "spiritual guide or teacher", which in Sangam literature appears as aciriyan (priest, teacher, scholar), aciriyam or akavar or akaval or akavu (a poetic meter).

The Sangam poetry focuses on the culture and people. It is almost entirely non-religious, except for the occasional mentions of the Hindu gods and more substantial mentions of various gods in the shorter poems. The 33 surviving poems of Paripaatal in the "Eight Anthologies" group praises Vishnu, Shiva, Durga and Murugan. Similarly, the 150 poems of Kalittokai – also from the Eight Anthologies group – mention Shiva, Murugan, various Pandava brothers of the Mahabharata, Kama, Krishna, goddesses such as Ganga, divine characters from classical love stories of India. One of the poems also mentions the "merciful men of Benares", an evidence of interaction between the northern holy city of the Hindus with the Sangam poets. Some of the Paripaatal love poems are set in the context of bathing festivals (Magh Mela) and various Hindu gods. They mention temples and shrines, confirming the significance of such cultural festivals and architectural practices to the Tamil culture. 

Further, the colophons of the Paripaatal poems mention music and tune, signifying the development and the importance of musical arts in ancient Tamil Nadu. According to Zvelebil, these poems were likely from the late Sangam era (2nd or 3rd century CE) and attest to a sophisticated and prosperous ancient civilization.

Modern musical renditions 

The first music album on Tamil Sangam poetry titled Sandham: Symphony Meets Classical Tamil by Composer Rajan Somasundaram in collaboration with Durham Symphony, featured in  Amazon's Top#10 'International Music albums' category in July 2020 and was called a "A Major event in the world of Music" by The Hindu Music review.

Sangam poems are often quoted and paraphrased in modern Tamil cinema.

See also 

 Project Madurai: open access Tamil literature repository
 List of historic Indian texts
 Tamiḻakam
 First Sangam
 Second Sangam
 Tamil Sangams
 List of Sangam poets

Notes

References

Bibliography 

 
 Selby, Martha Ann (2011) Tamil Love Poetry: The Five Hundred Short Poems of the Aiṅkuṟunūṟu, an Early Third-Century Anthology. Columbia University Press,

External links 
 sangamtranslationsbyvaidehi.com Sangam poetry with translation in English, Vaidehi Herbert

 
Indian poetics
Cultural history of Tamil Nadu
Hinduism
Hindu literature
Jainism
Jain literature
Dravidian languages
Indian poetry